Charles Urquhart Gravatt (June 28, 1849 – April 14, 1922) was an American physician, naval officer, and Democratic politician who served as a member of the Virginia Senate from 1908 until his death in 1922. A veteran of the Spanish–American War, he served as the fleet surgeon under Admiral William T. Sampson at the Battle of Santiago de Cuba.

His younger brother, William Loyall Gravatt, was the longtime Bishop of the Episcopal Diocese of West Virginia.

References

External links
 
 

1849 births
1922 deaths
Democratic Party Virginia state senators
20th-century American politicians
People from Port Royal, Virginia